is the eleventh episode of the Japanese anime television series Neon Genesis Evangelion, which was created by Gainax. The episode, written by Hideaki Anno and Yoji Enokido and directed by Tatsuya Watanabe, was first broadcast on TV Tokyo on December 13, 1995. The series is set fifteen years after a worldwide cataclysm and is mostly set in the futuristic, fortified city of Tokyo-3. The series' protagonist is Shinji Ikari, a teenage boy who is recruited by his father Gendo to the special military organization Nerv to pilot a gigantic, bio-mechanical mecha named Evangelion into combat with beings called Angels. In this episode, the special agency Nerv suddenly runs out of power due to sabotage by unidentified third parties. The three Evangelion mecha pilots, Shinji, Rei Ayanami and Asuka Langley Soryu, join forces to take down the ninth Angel, Matarael.

The episode, part of the series' action arc, blends comedy and action together and is markedly positive in its portrayal of the characters' relationships, particularly those of the three main characters. "The Day Tokyo-3 Stood Still" echoes Hideaki Anno's typical themes, seeking to philosophically explore the value of technology and its role in the contemporary world. Several companies were involved in the production of the episode, including Studio Ghibli. 

"The Day Tokyo-3 Stood Still" drew a 9.0% audience share on Japanese television, and was positively received by critics. Reviewers repeatedly praised Matarael's battle, pacing, script, positive tone, and the exploration of philosophical themes presented in the installment.

Plot
Shinji Ikari, the pilot of the mecha  Eva-01, calls his cold and distant father Gendo, supreme commander of the special agency Nerv. The call is suddenly cut off; the headquarters and Tokyo-3 are left without power. Nerv's Major Misato Katsuragi and her former boyfriend Ryoji Kaji become trapped in the elevator, while Dr. Ritsuko Akagi and other Nerv members systematically rule out the possibility of an accident, thus coming to the conclusion that the blackout is the result of sabotage by third parties in order to investigate the Nerv headquarters facility. The ninth in a series of enemies of humankind called Angels, Matarael, arrives at Tokyo-3. Shinji, along with his fellow pilots Rei Ayanami and Asuka Langley Soryu, enter through an air duct at Nerv, while Gendo and other Nerv members manage to activate the Evangelions manually without the aid of electricity. Shinji, Rei, and Asuka together manage to take down Matarael. The three pilots, lying on a knoll, see the lights of Tokyo-3 turn on again, while Shinji wonders what the reason is for the Angels to attack.

Production
In 1993, Gainax published a presentation document for Neon Genesis Evangelion entitled , containing the initial synopsis of "The Day Tokyo-3 Stood Still". In the authors' initial plan, the tenth episode would have seen Nerv headquarters stranded by an electrical blackout, while the eleventh involved an attempt to capture an Angel in the magma chamber of an active volcano. During the course of the work, however, the episodes were reversed in order, so the capture attempt was moved to "Magmadiver". The English title of the episode at the storyboard stage was "Panic in Geo Front", and only at a late stage did the staff decide to change it. Hideaki Anno, the series' main director, and Yoji Enokido wrote the script; Masayuki handled the storyboards. Tetsuya Watanabe served as director, while Toshio Kawagushi worked as chief animator.

The production process involved Studio Deen, Kenichi Yoshida and Fantasia studio, among others. Studio Ghibli also helped in the animation process of the episode. The staff chose to include several humorous gags throughout "The Day Tokyo-3 Stood Still"; because of animation director Toshio Kawagushi, the graphic rendering of the final result deviated from the other episodes in the series. The speaker character in the truck in which Hyuga climbs, for example, was rendered in a style typical of the Ghibli studio. Critic Dani Cavallaro noted how the staff made use of both "sophisticated CGI" for the depiction of Matarael and "traditional anime camera work" for the scenes depicting the Nerv pilots, in order "to consolidate technically the adventure's pervasive mood". A shot of the Milky Way was included in the final scene of the episode, and according to the series filmbooks the staff may have depicted the galaxy respecting the geography of the world of Evangelion, in which the Second Impact changed the Earth's tilt axis. The filmbooks also noted how in the installment Anno reflected his passion for railroads, Kazuya Tsurumaki his love for astronomy, and character designer of the series Yoshiyuki Sadamoto his passion for motoring.

The original script featured scenes that were later cut during the course of the work. The original storyboard included more scenes of Misato and Kaji trapped in an elevator and a scene in which Rei explains to his fellow pilots that the corridors to Nerv headquarters were made especially intricate to prevent terrorist attacks. Moreover, in the final scene, Shigeru Aoba would play an acoustic version of "A Cruel Angel's Thesis" on his guitar. Koichi Yamadera, Miki Nagasawa, Yuko Miyamura, Megumi Hayashibara, Kotono Mitsuishi, voice actors of several main characters in the series, played unidentified characters for "The Day Tokyo-3 Stood Still", along with Koichi Nagano, Hidenari Ugaki, Tomomichi Nishimura and Akiko Yajima. In addition to the original compositions, composed by Shiro Sagisu, the song "You are the only one" by Kotono Mitsuishi, Misato's original voice actress, was used in the scene where Makoto Hyuga picks up Misato's laundry. Claire Littley also sang a version of "Fly Me to the Moon" used as the episode's final theme song for the original broadcast, while in the late home video releases a version named "Rei, Asuka, Misato Ver." was used instead.

Cultural references, style and themes

In the first scene of "The Day Tokyo-3 Stood Still", Maya praises the qualities of science with a phrase already used by Anno in his previous anime, Nadia: The Secret of Blue Water. The installment reflects the director's epistemological interest, philosophically investigating the qualities or flaws of science and its relationship to man. Its title constitutes a reference to the film "The Day the Earth Stood Still" (1951), reflecting Anno's interest in science fiction. In the course of the episode, cans of the UCC Ueshima Coffee Co. brand are shown, similarly to another earlier work by Anno, Gunbuster. The name of the Tokyo-3 election candidate, Nozoku Takahashi, is also a reference to the Ghibli studio producer Nozomu Takahashi.

Asuka's behavior in "The Day Tokyo-3 Stood Still" and the following episode has been traced back to a masculine protest, a psychological term for a form of rebellion identifiable in women who are tired of the role stereotypically associated with the female gender. Asuka acts as if she is trying to prove herself and surpass the male gender, fusing an inferiority complex and radical rivalry.

The episode, part of the series' action arc, features a fusion of comic tones and a strong action component. It depicts for the first time the three pilots of the Evangelion mechas acting in unison, and positively portrays the interpersonal relationships of the main characters. Gendo, usually emotionally unapproachable and cold, shows an unusually human and responsible face by helping his subordinates at Nerv to manually operate the Eva. Shinji himself is surprised, and their relationships seem to be closer than in episodes before. Asuka also seems to grow closer and accept Rei as her own teammate.

In the course of the episode Shinji wonders why the Angels attack. According to writer Michael Berman, his attitude suggests that God is "virtually nonexistent" in the world of Evangelion, or indifferent to human affairs, as Nerv's motto suggests, "God's in His Heaven, All's right with the World". In the final scene, Rei argues that in order to survive, humanity has driven out darkness with fire, while Asuka mocks her by saying, "Philosophy, huh?". Newtype magazine pointed out that Rei sees the world with the innocent eyes of a child.  Analyzing the scene, writer Dennis Redmond described Rei as a symbol of an empty and "lyric neonational interiority", while Asuka as a mirror of a pragmatic and "outrageous multinational exteriority".

Reception
"The Day Tokyo-3 Stood Still" was first broadcast on December 13, 1995, and drew a 9.0% audience share on Japanese television, the second highest for an episode of Neon Genesis Evangelion to date. Merchandise on the episode has also been released.

"The Day Tokyo-3 Stood Still" received a positive critical reception. Jalopnik.com, for example, described it as a "fantastic episode". Akio Nagatomi of The Anime Café, normally critical of the series, appreciated the pace of the script, and while noting flaws he said that "the weaknesses take a back seat to the stronger script writing, and the excellent pace set by the director". Film School Rejects's Max Covill said, "This episode stands out because of the subtle character moments between the three children". Matthew Garcia of Multiversity Comics praised the use of music and silences, while Jacob Parker-Dalton of Otaquest applauded the philosophical exploration of the role of technology in the modern world.

Looper described Matarael as a "profoundly brilliant and disgusting in equal measure" enemy. Its fight against the three Evas has been repeatedly praised by critics and listed among the best battles in the series. Anime News Network's Martin Theron said that the battle presented in "The Day Tokyo-3 Stood Still" is "suitably exciting and creative, and it's a bit of an extra thrill to finally get to see all three Evas operating in tandem". Screen Rant lauded its "really satistying conclusion", while Mcccagora's Noah Black praised Gendo acting against viewer expectations by showing an unusually human side.

Matarael's design inspired Nobuhiro Watsuki to create the eye costume of Usui Uonuma, one of the characters in the manga Rurouni Kenshin. A parody of Matarael appears in FLCL, an OAV series produced by Gainax studio.

References

Citations

Bibliography

External links
 

1995 Japanese television episodes
Neon Genesis Evangelion episodes
Science fiction television episodes